

Religion and Mythology
 Garden of the gods (Sumerian paradise), a concept in Ancient Mesopotamian religion
 Garden of the Gods in Norse mythology, the etymological root of Asgard

Literature 
The Garden of the Gods, the third book in Gerald Durrell's Corfu Trilogy

Places 

 Garden of the Gods, in Colorado Springs, Colorado
 Garden of the Gods Wilderness in Southern Illinois
 Garden of the Gods in Lanai, Hawaii
 Garden of the Gods, Isle of Skye in Scotland